Torch is the first album by Devon Allman's Honeytribe.  It was originally released in 2006, by Livewire Recordings, then rereleased in 2007 by Provogue Records.

Reception
Thom Jurek, on AllMusic, said the album "feels like a debut album," but not an "overly impressive debut." While he praised individual musicians' skill, he was not impressed with the overall production and the final mix; still, he said the band was "surely on the right track."

Track listing 
All songs composed by Devon Allman, except where noted.

Personnel
Devon Allman's Honeytribe
Devon Allman - vocals and guitars
George Potsos - bass guitar
Jack Kirkner - keyboards, (piano, Hammond B-3 organ, Wurlitzer electric piano)
Mark Oyarzabal - drums and percussion

Guests
Pedro Arevalo - slide guitar on "No Woman, No Cry", "Heaven Has No Mercy" and "Why You Wanna Bring Me Down?"
Tony Antonelli - percussion on "Mahalo"
Joe Bonamassa - guitar on "Mercy Mercy"

References

External links 
 Devon Allman's Honeytribe

Photographs 

2006 albums
Honeytribe albums
Devon Allman albums